The Presbyterian Church in Korea (Logos) was formed by Pastor Kim Hyun-Bong and 7 churches in 1970. Since 1971 it has the Logos Seminary. In 1990 it became Logos Assembly, and affirms the Westminster Confession of Faith and the Apostles Creed. The denomination has 20 congregations and 1,000 members.

References 

Presbyterian denominations in South Korea
Presbyterian denominations in Asia